This is a list of members of the South Australian Legislative Council from 1947 to 1950.

 LCL MLC Douglas Peel Gordon died on 9 October 1948. Colin Rowe was elected unopposed to the vacancy on 1 November.
 LCL MLC Percy Blesing died on 2 March 1949. Robert Richard Wilson won the resulting by-election on 14 May.
 LCL MLC Norman Brookman died on 26 April 1949. John Lancelot Cowan was elected unopposed to the vacancy on 26 May.

References
Parliament of South Australia — Statistical Record of the Legislature

Members of South Australian parliaments by term
20th-century Australian politicians